Warren Patmore is a former non-league footballer most notable for his career with Yeovil Town where he is considered one of the club's greatest ever players, scoring 140 goals in 287 games for the Glovers, making him the club's third top goal-scorer of all time.

Playing career
Patmore played for many league clubs including Cambridge United, Millwall and Northampton Town. He then went to Northern Ireland to play for Ards before finding first team football at non-league club Yeovil Town.

In the summer of 2001 Patmore moved to Rushden & Diamonds, scoring on his debut for Rushden against York City.

Patmore also played for the England non-league side on a number of occasions before ending his career at Margate in 2003.

Management

Patmore was an instant success with Management gaining two promotions in three seasons with Devon & Exeter Football League side Morchard Bishop. Looking for a return to Somerset Patmore applied unsuccessfully for the vacant managerial job at Taunton Town. However he was successful with his application for the managerial position at Wellington in June 2009. In what was only Wellington's second season in the Premier Division he guided them to a tenth-place finish. On 9 May 2010, Patmore resigned as Wellington manager, citing distance to travel as the main reason behind his resignation. In June 2010 he was appointed as the new manager of South West Peninsula League side Witheridge, but left the club in November by mutual consent after issues with the chairman, and the club mid-table.

He later managed Crediton United but left the club after leading the club to their highest placed league finish in 21 years of 4th, due to "club lacking the ambition to move forward". He subsequently took charge of Tiverton Town's reserve team, but quit at the end of the 2016–17 season.

Season by season

Honours

Managerial

Morchard Bishop
Devon & Exeter Senior Division 3 League winners 2006–07
Devon & Exeter Senior Division 4 League runners up 2007–08 (Champions Beacon Knights)

Crediton Utd
South West Peninsula Football League 4th-place finish 2011-12

Tiverton Town Reserves 
Devon & Exeter Senior Premier Runners up 2012-13
Devon & Exeter Senior Premier League Winners 2013-14
Throgmorton Champion's Cup Winners 2013-14
Southwest Peninsula League East Winners 2015-16

References

1971 births
English footballers
Footballers from Kingsbury, London
Northwood F.C. players
Cambridge United F.C. players
Bashley F.C. players
Millwall F.C. players
Cobh Ramblers F.C. players
Northampton Town F.C. players
Dundalk F.C. players
Ards F.C. players
Yeovil Town F.C. players
Rushden & Diamonds F.C. players
Woking F.C. players
Margate F.C. players
Wellington A.F.C. players
League of Ireland players
English football managers
Wellington A.F.C. managers
Crediton United A.F.C. managers
Elmore F.C. managers
Living people
Association football forwards